Interstate 40 (I-40) is an east–west Interstate Highway that has a  section in the U.S. state of Arkansas, connecting Oklahoma to Tennessee. The route enters Arkansas from the west just north of the Arkansas River near Dora. It travels eastward across the northern portion of the state, connecting the cities of Fort Smith, Clarksville, Russellville, Morrilton, Conway, North Little Rock, Forrest City, and West Memphis. I-40 continues into Tennessee, heading through Memphis. The highway has major junctions with I-540 at Van Buren (the main highway connecting to Fort Smith), I-49 at Alma (the main highway connecting to Fayetteville and Bentonville), I-30 in North Little Rock (the Interstate linking south to Texarkana and Dallas, Texas), and I-55 to Blytheville.

For the majority of its routing through Arkansas, I-40 follows the historic alignment of two separate U.S. Highways. From Oklahoma to Little Rock, I-40 generally follows U.S. Highway 64 through the Ozark Mountains. East of Little Rock, the route generally follows the routing of US 70 until the Tennessee state line.

Route description

Oklahoma to Little Rock

I-40 enters Arkansas from Oklahoma at Dora in Crawford County. It heads east into Van Buren, giving access to Fort Smith as well across the Arkansas River to the south. Access is primarily via I-540/US 71, which was built as a southern spur to Fort Smith in the 1970s. I-40 overlaps with US 71, forming a concurrency until the alignment of I-49 breaks north to Fayetteville, Springdale, Rogers, Bentonville, and its northern Arkansas terminus in Bella Vista, with US 71 breaking away shortly afterward at another interchange. The route continues to parallel US 64 into the Ozark Mountains by entering Franklin County and providing access to the Pig Trail Scenic Byway in Ozark. I-40 runs through Clarksville (where it has a junction with US 64), passes over part of Lake Dardanelle, and meets Highway 7 (AR 7) in Russellville. I-40 continues to the east through Morrilton before turning south to Conway and Faulkner County. In Conway, I-40 forms a concurrency with US 65 at exit 125, which will continue until exit 153A in Little Rock. The highway also has another junction with US 64 and U.S. Highway 65 Business (US 65B) in Conway before passing Lake Conway and entering the Little Rock metropolitan area.

Little Rock to Tennessee

Now in Pulaski County, I-40 heads toward the south-southeast as it heads to the town of Maumelle. It continues toward this direction until it reaches I-430, which provides access along the westside of Little Rock. Further southeast near the Arkansas River, the route has a high volume interchange as the northern terminus of I-30 as well as concurrent routes with US 67/US 167; US 65 turns south at this intersection, breaking the concurrency formed in Conway. I-40 (now concurrent with US 67 and US 167) continues east for  before the US 67/US 167 concurrency turns north as a separate northeasterly expressway. From this point onward, I-40 begins to parallel US 70 rather than US 64, which was a more or less a parallel route until Conway. The Interstate continues to the east to intersect the concurrency of I-440/AR 440 before entering Lonoke County. Passing through Lonoke, the route runs through rural Arkansas with straight alignments and relatively few junctions, forming an overlap with US 63 in Hazen until meeting US 49/AR 17 in Brinkley. Upon entering St. Francis County, I-40 runs northeast to Forrest City, where it intersects with AR 1. Continuing northeast, I-40 enters Crittenden County, where it intersects with US 79 at Shearerville and enters West Memphis.

I-40 continues east onto the Hernando de Soto Bridge over the Mississippi River. The Tennessee border is at the midpoint of the river, and Memphis, Tennessee, begins at the eastside of the bridge.

History

Exit list

References

External links

40
 Arkansas
Transportation in Crawford County, Arkansas
Transportation in Franklin County, Arkansas
Transportation in Johnson County, Arkansas
Transportation in Pope County, Arkansas
Transportation in Conway County, Arkansas
Transportation in Faulkner County, Arkansas
Transportation in Pulaski County, Arkansas
Transportation in Lonoke County, Arkansas
Transportation in Prairie County, Arkansas
Transportation in Monroe County, Arkansas
Transportation in St. Francis County, Arkansas
Transportation in Crittenden County, Arkansas
Monuments and memorials in Arkansas